Charlie Brown's may refer to
 Charlie Brown's Fresh Grill, a franchise of dining restaurants based in New Jersey, US
 Charlie Brown's, Limehouse, a public house in East London
 Charlie Brown's Roundabout, a former public house and road junction in Woodford, outer London